The Fairest of Them All is the fifth solo studio album by American singer-songwriter Dolly Parton. It was released on February 2, 1970, by RCA Victor. The album was produced by Bob Ferguson. It peaked at number 13 on the Billboard Top Country Albums chart. The album's only single, "Daddy Come and Get Me", peaked at number 40 on the Billboard Hot Country Songs chart.

Recording
Recording sessions for the album began on September 4, 1969, at RCA Studio B in Nashville, Tennessee. Two additional sessions followed on October 30 and 31. "I'm Doing This for Your Sake" was recorded during the September 10, 1968 session for 1969's In the Good Old Days (When Times Were Bad). "Mammie" and "But You Loved Me Then" were recorded during sessions for 1969's My Blue Ridge Mountain Boy, on May 13 and 21, 1969, respectively.

Content
Included is "Down from Dover", a song about the misfortune of a pregnant unwed girl, who waits in vain for the baby's father while being shunned by her parents. The song was controversial for the times and Parton has stated in recent interviews that mentor (and uncredited producer) Porter Wagoner told her that she'd never get played on the radio with story songs like that.

Two other story songs, "Robert" and "Daddy Come and Get Me", are distinctive for their themes. The former tells the story of a boy infatuated with a girl, not knowing that they are brother and sister. The story is a true story based on Parton's life, her father had at least one child with another woman. The latter is a haunting tale, co-written with Dorothy Jo Hope, Parton's aunt, about a woman begging her father to release her from the mental institution that her cheating husband placed her in.

The liner notes for the album were written by Parton’s assistant, friend and confidante, Judy Ogle.

In a CMT interview with Patty Loveless, Parton joked that it was about the funniest album cover she had ever made, with the largest collar she could find. She said she was trying to look like a fairytale character. The cover photo was taken by Bill Goodman, a photographer for the Nashville Banner.

Parton re-recorded "Down from Dover" for her 2001 album Little Sparrow with an additional verse that was cut from the original.

Release and promotion
The album was released February 2, 1970, on LP.

Singles
The album's only single, "Daddy Come and Get Me", was released in December 1969 and debuted at number 67 on the Billboard Hot Country Songs chart dated January 21, 1970. It peaked at number 40 on the chart dated March 7, its sixth week on the chart. It charted for eight weeks. The single also peaked at number 31 in Canada on the RPM Country Singles chart.

Critical reception

Billboard'''s review of the album in the February 14, 1970 issue said, "A very strong album in more ways than one. "Daddy Come and Get Me" is in the traditional jilted love vein, then "Down from Dover" follows. The "Dover" tune is very beautiful and well produced, but the theme is perhaps a little too strong for airplay, even in this day of enlightenment. "Just the Way I Am" is beautiful and not so strong. Dolly Parton is sensational, as usual."Cashbox published a review in the issue dated February 7, 1970, which said, "Many of Dolly Parton’s male fans will agree that she is "The Fairest of Them All", and all her fans will agree that vocally, she's one of country music's brightest young stars. Teeing off this set with her current single, Dolly goes on to sing a host of strong tunes, most of which are her own compositions. Should be a nice chart spot on tap for this package. Watch it closely for action."

Stephen Thomas Erlewine gave the album 4.5 out of 5 stars in a review for AllMusic. He noted that while the album "lacks any of Dolly Parton’s early masterpieces...it’s one of her strongest early LPs."

Commercial performance
The album debuted at number 38 on the Billboard Top Country Albums chart dated March 14, 1970. It peaked at number 13 on the chart dated May 9, its ninth week on the chart. The album charted for 17 weeks.

Reissues
The album was reissued on CD in 2010 with Parton's 1972 album My Favorite Songwriter, Porter Wagoner''. It was released as a digital download on January 11, 2011.

Track listing

Personnel
Adapted from the album liner notes and RCA recording session records.

Joseph Babcock – background vocals
Jerry Carrigan – drums
Dolores Edgin – background vocals
Bob Ferguson – producer
Bill Goodman – cover photo
Lloyd Green – pedal steel
Milton Henderson – recording technician
Junior Huskey – bass
Mack Magaha – fiddle
George McCormick – rhythm guitar
Wayne Moss – guitar
Judy H. Ogle – liner notes
Al Pachucki – recording engineer
June Page – background vocals
Dolly Parton – lead vocals
Hargus Robbins – piano
Roy Shockley – recording technician
Jerry Stembridge – guitar
Buck Trent – electric banjo

Charts

Release history

References

Dolly Parton albums
1970 albums
Albums produced by Bob Ferguson (music)
RCA Records albums